The 1994 United States House of Representatives elections in South Carolina were held on November 8, 1994, to select six Representatives for two-year terms from the state of South Carolina.  The primary elections for the Democrats and the Republicans were held on August 9 and the runoff elections were held two weeks later on August 23.  All four incumbents who ran were re-elected and the Republicans won both of the open seats in the 1st congressional district and the 3rd congressional district.  The composition of the state delegation after the elections was four Republicans and two Democrats.

1st congressional district
Incumbent Republican Congressman Arthur Ravenel, Jr. of the 1st congressional district, in office since 1987, chose to run for Governor instead of re-election.  Mark Sanford, a real estate developer from Sullivan's Island, won the Republican primary and defeated Democrat Robert Barber in the general election.

Republican primary

General election results

|-
| 
| colspan=5 |Republican hold
|-

2nd congressional district
Incumbent Republican Congressman Floyd Spence of the 2nd congressional district, in office since 1971, was unopposed in his bid for re-election.

General election results

|-
| 
| colspan=5 |Republican hold
|-

3rd congressional district
Incumbent Democratic Congressman Butler Derrick of the 3rd congressional district, in office since 1975, opted to retire.  Lindsey Graham, a state representative from Oconee County, won the Republican primary and defeated Democrat James E. Bryan, Jr. in the general election.

Democratic primary

Republican primary

General election results

|-
| 
| colspan=5 |Republican gain from Democratic
|-

4th congressional district
Incumbent Republican Congresswoman Bob Inglis of the 4th congressional district, in office since 1993, defeated Democratic challenger Jerry L. Fowler.

General election results

|-
| 
| colspan=5 |Republican hold
|-

5th congressional district
Incumbent Democratic Congressman John M. Spratt, Jr. of the 5th congressional district, in office since 1983, defeated Republican challenger Larry Bigham.

General election results

|-
| 
| colspan=5 |Democratic hold
|-

6th congressional district
Incumbent Democratic Congressman Jim Clyburn of the 6th congressional district, in office since 1993, defeated Republican challenger Gary McLeod.

Democratic primary

General election results

|-
| 
| colspan=5 |Democratic hold
|-

See also
1994 United States House of Representatives elections
1994 South Carolina gubernatorial election
South Carolina's congressional districts

References

1994 South Carolina elections
1994
South Carolina